The men's middleweight is a competition featured at the 2019 World Taekwondo Championships, and was held at the Manchester Arena in Manchester, United Kingdom on 19 May. Heavyweights were limited to a maximum of 87 kilograms in body mass.

Medalists

Results
Legend
W — Won by withdrawal

Finals

Top half

Section 1

Section 2

Bottom half

Section 3

Section 4

References
Draw
Results

External links
Official website

Men's 87